Football was contested for men only at the 1986 Central American and Caribbean Games in Santo Domingo, Dominican Republic.

Group A

Group B

Group C

Group D

Both Mexico and Bahamas advanced to the quarterfinals, results unknown.

Knockout stage

Bracket

Semifinals

Bronze medal match

Final

References

1986 Central American and Caribbean Games
1986